Snehal Dabi (born 24 February 1977) is an Indian actor, writer, director, and producer born into a Gujarati family and brought up in Mumbai. He is a theater performer since his school days. He has performed in Hindi language films, Marathi, Gujarati commercial theatre.

Career 

Dabi studied electronics engineering from B.V.I.T. CBD Belapur. He debuted in Mahanta then Satya during his college, He also assisted in writing of Hera Pheri. He has studied screenplay-writing and direction from London film academy. He debuted as a writer in Darwaza bandh rakho. His characters became popular as Chandar in Satya, Aaj Kapoor in Love Ke Liye Kuch Bhi Karega, Habiba in Ek Chalis Ki Last Local, electric Baba in Wednesday, and more. He has acted in films like excuse me, welcome, mast, Hera Pheri, EMI, Pyare Mohan.
Dabi's banner The Outstanding Production, has produced short films, music videos, and commercial. The outstanding production has also produced a Hindi feature film Utaavle Baawale in association with Ramayan Chitra.

Selected filmography

References

External links

Living people
Indian male film actors
Male actors in Hindi cinema
21st-century Indian male actors
1977 births